Sunnydale is a historic commercial building located at Tryon, Polk County, North Carolina.  It was designed by architect J. Foster Searles and built about 1930.  It is a one-story, five bay, side-gable log building with flanking two bay setback side-gable wings.  It features an exterior stone chimney with an exterior fireplace and an attached one-story shed-roof side porch.  It was originally built as an entertainment venue, which hosted dinners, dances, receptions, and theatrical performances.  The building was renovated in 2010 and gifted to Tryon Little Theater late in 2011.

It was added to the National Register of Historic Places in 2011.

References

External links
Sunnydale website

Commercial buildings on the National Register of Historic Places in North Carolina
Commercial buildings completed in 1930
Buildings and structures in Polk County, North Carolina
National Register of Historic Places in Polk County, North Carolina
1930 establishments in North Carolina
National Register of Historic Places in North Carolina